The following is an alphabetical list of articles related to the U.S. state of Wyoming.

0–9 

.wy.us – Internet second-level domain for the state government
27th meridian west from Washington
34th meridian west from Washington
41st parallel north
42nd parallel north
43rd parallel north
44th parallel north
44th State to join the United States
45th parallel north
105th meridian west
106th meridian west
107th meridian west
108th meridian west
109th meridian west
110th meridian west
111th meridian west

A
Absaroka Range
Adams-Onís Treaty of 1819
Adjacent states:

Agriculture in Wyoming
Airports in Wyoming
Albany County
American bison
American Redoubt
Archaeology of Wyoming
:Category:Archaeological sites in Wyoming
commons:Category:Archaeological sites in Wyoming
Architecture of Wyoming
Area codes in Wyoming
Art museums and galleries in Wyoming
commons:Category:Art museums and galleries in Wyoming
Artists of Wyoming
Astronomical observatories in Wyoming
commons:Category:Astronomical observatories in Wyoming

B
Battle of the Tongue River
Big Horn County
Big Horn Mountains
Bison bison
Black Hills
Black Hills War
Botanical gardens in Wyoming
commons:Category:Botanical gardens in Wyoming
Bridges in Wyoming
Bridges on the National Register of Historic Places in Wyoming
Bucking Horse and Rider
Buildings and structures in Wyoming
commons:Category:Buildings and structures in Wyoming

C

California Trail
Campbell County
Canyons and gorges of Wyoming
commons:Category:Canyons and gorges of Wyoming
Capital of the State of Wyoming
Capitol of the State of Wyoming
Carbon County
Castilleja linariifolia
Census Designated Places in Wyoming
Census Designated Places in Wyoming
Census statistical areas in Wyoming
Cities in Wyoming
Cheyenne, territorial and state capital since 1869
Casper
Laramie
Gillette
Rock Springs
Sheridan
Green River
Evanston
Riverton
Cody
Climate change in Wyoming 
Climate of Wyoming
Cloud Peak
Coal mining in Wyoming
Cody, William Frederick "Buffalo Bill"
Colleges and universities in Wyoming
Communications in Wyoming
commons:Category:Communications in Wyoming

Companies of Wyoming
:Category:Companies based in Wyoming
Converse County
 Counties of the State of Wyoming
Wyoming counties ranked by per capita income
COVID-19 pandemic in Wyoming
Crime in Wyoming
Crook County
Culture of Wyoming
commons:Category:Wyoming culture
Cutthroat trout
 Yellowstone cutthroat trout
 Snake River fine-spotted cutthroat trout

D

Dams in Wyoming
Demographics of Wyoming
Devils Tower National Monument

E
Economy of Wyoming
:Category:Economy of Wyoming
commons:Category:Economy of Wyoming
Education in Wyoming
:Category:Education in Wyoming
commons:Category:Education in Wyoming
Elections in Wyoming
commons:Category:Wyoming elections
Energy resource facilities in Wyoming
Environment of Wyoming:
:Category:Environment of Wyoming
commons:Category:Environment of Wyoming
Equal Rights (motto)

F

Federal lands in Wyoming
Fictional cities and towns in Wyoming
Films set in Wyoming
Flag of Wyoming
Flora of Wyoming
Forkwood (soil) website
Forts in Wyoming
Fort Laramie
:Category:Forts in Wyoming
commons:Category:Forts in Wyoming
Fossil Butte National Monument
Fremont County

G

Gangs in Wyoming
Gannett Peak
Geography of Wyoming
:Category:Geography of Wyoming
commons:Category:Geography of Wyoming
Geology of Wyoming
commons:Category:Geology of Wyoming
George Floyd protests in Wyoming
Geysers of Wyoming
commons:Category:Geysers of Wyoming
Ghost towns in Wyoming
:Category:Ghost towns in Wyoming
commons:Category:Ghost towns in Wyoming
Glaciers of Wyoming
commons:Category:Glaciers of Wyoming
Golf clubs and courses in Wyoming
Goshen County
Government of Wyoming  website
:Category:Government of Wyoming
commons:Category:Government of Wyoming
List of governors of Wyoming
Wyoming Governor's Mansion
Grand Canyon of the Yellowstone
Grand Teton
Grand Teton National Park
Great Basin
Great Plains
Great Seal of the State of Wyoming
Green River

H
High Plains
High Plains Uranium
High schools in Wyoming
Highway routes in Wyoming
Hiking trails in Wyoming
commons:Category:Hiking trails in Wyoming
History of Wyoming
Historical outline of Wyoming
:Category:History of Wyoming
commons:Category:History of Wyoming
Horned lizard
Hot Springs County
Hot springs of Wyoming
commons:Category:Hot springs of Wyoming
Houses in Wyoming

I
Images of Wyoming
commons:Category:Wyoming
Islands in Wyoming

J

Jackson Hole
John D. Rockefeller, Jr. Memorial Parkway
Johnson County

K
Knightia

L
Lakes of Wyoming
commons:Category:Lakes of Wyoming
Landforms of Wyoming
Landmarks in Wyoming
commons:Category:Landmarks in Wyoming
Laramie County
Laramie Peak
Laramie Range
Laramie River
Law and government of Wyoming
Law enforcement agencies in Wyoming
Law schools in Wyoming
Legislature of Wyoming
Wyoming Senate
Wyoming House of Representatives
:Category:Members of the Wyoming Legislature
Lincoln County
Lists related to Wyoming:
List of airports in Wyoming
List of bridges on the National Register of Historic Places in Wyoming
List of census statistical areas in Wyoming
List of cities in Wyoming
List of colleges and universities in Wyoming
List of counties in Wyoming
List of dams and reservoirs in Wyoming
List of forts in Wyoming
List of ghost towns in Wyoming
List of governors of Wyoming
List of high schools in Wyoming
List of highway routes in Wyoming
List of islands in Wyoming
List of lakes in Wyoming
List of law enforcement agencies in Wyoming
List of museums in Wyoming
List of National Historic Landmarks in Wyoming
List of newspapers in Wyoming
List of people from Wyoming
List of power stations in Wyoming
List of radio stations in Wyoming
List of rivers of Wyoming
List of school districts in Wyoming
List of Wyoming companies
List of state prisons of Wyoming
List of telephone area codes in Wyoming
List of television stations in Wyoming
List of United States congressional delegations from Wyoming
List of United States congressional district of Wyoming
List of United States representatives from Wyoming
List of United States senators from Wyoming
National Register of Historic Places listings in Wyoming
Louisiana Purchase of 1803

M

Mammoth Hot Springs
Maps of Wyoming
commons:Category:Maps of Wyoming
Mass media in Wyoming
Metropolitan areas of Wyoming
Metropolitan areas in Wyoming
Micropolitan areas in Wyoming
Military in Wyoming
Mormon Trail
Mountains of Wyoming
Mountain peaks of the Rocky Mountains
commons:Category:Mountains of Wyoming
Mountain passes in Wyoming
Mountain ranges in Wyoming
Museums in Wyoming
:Category:Museums in Wyoming
commons:Category:Museums in Wyoming
Music of Wyoming
:Category:Music of Wyoming
commons:Category:Music of Wyoming
:Category:Musical groups from Wyoming
:Category:Musicians from Wyoming

N

National Forests of Wyoming
commons:Category:National Forests of Wyoming
National Historic Landmarks in Wyoming
:Category:National Historic Landmarks in Wyoming
National Natural Landmarks in Wyoming
National parks in Wyoming
National Wildlife Refuges in Wyoming
Natrona County
Natural arches of Wyoming
commons:Category:Natural arches of Wyoming
Natural disasters in Wyoming
Natural gas pipelines in Wyoming
Natural history of Wyoming
commons:Category:Natural history of Wyoming
Nephrite
Newspapers in Wyoming
:Category:Newspapers published in Wyoming
Nez Perce War
Niobrara County
North Platte River

O

Old Faithful Geyser
Oncorhynchus clarki
Oregon Country
Oregon Trail
Oregon Treaty of 1846

P

Park County
Parks in Wyoming
Pascopyrum smithii
People from Wyoming
:Category:People from Wyoming
commons:Category:People from Wyoming
:Category:People by city in Wyoming
:Category:People by county in Wyoming
:Category:People from Wyoming by occupation
Phrynosoma douglassi brevirostre
Wyoming places ranked by per capita income
Plains cottonwood
Platte County
Politics of Wyoming
commons:Category:Politics of Wyoming
Populus sargentii
Powder River Country
Prisons of Wyoming
:Category:Prisons in Wyoming
Protected areas of Wyoming
commons:Category:Protected areas of Wyoming

Q

R
Radio stations in Wyoming
Railroad museums in Wyoming
commons:Category:Railroad museums in Wyoming
Red Cloud's War
Red Desert (Wyoming)
Regions of Wyoming
Registered Historic Places in Wyoming
Religion in Wyoming
:Category:Religion in Wyoming
commons:Category:Religion in Wyoming
Rivers of Wyoming
:Category:Rivers of Wyoming
Rock formations in Wyoming
Rockefeller Memorial Parkway
Rock formations in Wyoming
commons:Category:Rock formations in Wyoming
Rocky Mountains
Rodeo

S

Sacagawea dollar
School districts in Wyoming
:Category:School districts in Wyoming
Scouting in Wyoming
Settlements in Wyoming
Cities in Wyoming
Towns in Wyoming
Census-designated places in Wyoming
Other unincorporated communities in Wyoming
List of ghost towns in Wyoming
Sheridan County
Shopping malls in Wyoming
Ski areas and resorts in Wyoming
commons:Category:Ski areas and resorts in Wyoming
Snake River
Solar power in Wyoming
South Pass (Wyoming)
Sports in Wyoming
:Category:Sports in Wyoming
commons:Category:Sports in Wyoming
:Category:Sports venues in Wyoming
commons:Category:Sports venues in Wyoming
State parks of Wyoming
Structures in Wyoming
commons:Category:Buildings and structures in Wyoming
Sturnella neglecta
Supreme Court of Wyoming
State symbols:
Wyoming state bird
Wyoming state coin
Wyoming state dinosaur
Wyoming state emblem
Wyoming state fish
Wyoming state flag
Wyoming state flower
Wyoming state fossil
Wyoming state gemstone
Wyoming state grass
Wyoming state mammal
Wyoming state motto
Wyoming state nickname
Wyoming state reptile
Wyoming state seal
Wyoming state soil website
Wyoming state song
Wyoming state sport
Wyoming state tree
Sublette County
Sweetwater County

T
Telecommunications in Wyoming
commons:Category:Communications in Wyoming
Television shows set in Wyoming
Telephone area codes in Wyoming
Television stations in Wyoming
Territories:
Dakota Territory, (1861–1863)-(1864–1868)-1889
Idaho Territory, (1863–1868)-1890
Louisiana Territory, 1805–1812
Missouri Territory, 1812–1821
Nebraska Territory, (1854–1863)-1867
Oregon Territory, (1848–1853)-1859
Utah Territory, (1850–1868)-1896
Washington Territory, (1853–1863)-1889
Wyoming Territory, 1868–1890
Teton County
Teton Range
Tourism in Wyoming  website
commons:Category:Tourism in Wyoming
Towns in Wyoming
Triceratops
Transportation in Wyoming
:Category:Transportation in Wyoming
commons:Category:Transport in Wyoming
Treaty of Guadalupe Hidalgo of 1848

U
Unincorporated communities in Wyoming
Uinta County
Uinta Mountains
United States of America
States of the United States of America
United States census statistical areas of Wyoming
United States congressional delegations from Wyoming
United States congressional district of Wyoming
United States Court of Appeals for the Tenth Circuit
United States District Court for the District of Wyoming
United States representatives from Wyoming
United States senators from Wyoming
Universities and colleges in Wyoming
:Category:Universities and colleges in Wyoming
University of Wyoming
Uranium mining in Wyoming
US-WY – ISO 3166-2:US region code for Wyoming

V
Valleys of Wyoming
Volcanoes of Wyoming

W

Washakie County
Waterfalls of Wyoming
commons:Category:Waterfalls of Wyoming
Watersheds in Wyoming
Western meadowlark
Western wheatgrass
Weston County
Wikimedia
Wikimedia Commons:Category:Wyoming
commons:Category:Maps of Wyoming
Wikinews:Category:Wyoming
Wikinews:Portal:Wyoming
Wikipedia Category:Wyoming
Wikipedia:WikiProject Wyoming
:Category:WikiProject Wyoming articles
:Category:WikiProject Wyoming members
Wilderness areas in Wyoming
Wind power in Wyoming
Wind River Peak
Wind River Range
Writers of Wyoming
WY – United States Postal Service postal code for Wyoming
Wyoming  website
:Category:Wyoming
commons:Category:Wyoming
commons:Category:Maps of Wyoming
Wyoming (song)
Wyoming Community Foundation
Wyoming Contractors Association
Wyoming Cowboys soccer
Wyoming Department of Revenue
Wyoming Governor's Mansion
Wyoming Indian paintbrush
Wyoming Writers, Inc.
Wyoming State Capital
Wyoming State Capitol
Wyoming state prisons
Wyoming Supreme Court
Wyoming Territory
Wyoming Workforce Development Council

X

Y
Yellowstone Caldera
Yellowstone Falls
Yellowstone Lake
Yellowstone National Park
Yellowstone River
Yellowstone Park bison herd

Z

See also

Topic overview:
Wyoming
Outline of Wyoming

Wyoming
 
Wyoming